Michael Speaks (born 1977) is an American R&B and gospel singer/songwriter originally from Benton Harbor, Michigan. He is best known for his singles "Whatever You Need" and "Just Wanna (Dance Now)", in addition to his appearance on the first season of America's Got Talent.

Biography
His desire to sing was initially inspired by his brother, who began playing piano at the age of three. The son of a preacher, Speaks' first experience performing for audiences was in the gospel choir. However, after a short time – and at a young age – he decided to plant his own flag as an entertainer.

“When I was 10 years old, I started a group called Christian Brothers," Speaks said. "We were singing in churches all over the city, and one day my voice changed and the rest of the members just stopped performing when I was singing this song called 'Sign Me Up.' They couldn't believe how good I was … and they had me sing that song all the time.”

Young Michael soon took his act on the road, performing in talent shows in Indiana and across the South. He subsequently moved to New York City, where he drew crowds by singing in subway stations. "When I arrived in New York, I saw these guys singing on the street," he said. "People were stopping to listen to the singers and dropping money in their buckets. So, I thought to myself, 'This must be how you get discovered.' I went down to 34th Street in front of Macy's department store and started doing the same thing. I didn't have a bucket – I just had a hat, and took it off to gather my tips. The more money that was put into my hat, the louder I sang. I made between $50 and $200 a day just singing on the street.”

Record Deal
One winning performance, at the Apollo Theater, caught the attention of executives at East West Records. The label signed Speaks to a six-figure record deal. "I cut my first single, 'Whatever You Need,' which debuted at number 49 on the Billboard Top 200 music chart," he said. "I had my record deal for three years, and worked with Missy Elliott and Babyface. Shortly after, I decided I wanted to go back to my gospel roots.”

It was around this time that a friend called Speaks to say that a band, Next Movement, needed a singer to sit in for some performances at Bally's. The opportunity to take the stage in the world's entertainment capital was irresistible; Speaks arrived in Las Vegas in 1997, and it was not long before the band invited him to become a permanent member.

In the years since, Speaks has formed his own band, Hypnotic. He also performs regularly with Mocha – a group composed of former Next Movement members. "I think the Strip is more open to African-American performers now," Speaks said. "Vegas has taken us for granted for a while, but now I think they realize that we are a necessity to the glam and entertainment of Vegas.”

Present day
In August 2013, Speaks issued On the Move Again, featuring the single "What Would You Do." He describes his music as "universal soul," which he says is based on showcasing positive themes. “I was born with a spirit of joy," Speaks said, "and I tell everyone that if you seek the kingdom of heaven first in your life, everything else will grow.”

In 2013, he released the digital single "God Can Do Anything" on iTunes and other services.

In 2017, he featured on Hopsin´s song "Marcus' Gospel" off his album No Shame.

Discography

Albums

Singles

Non-album appearances
 "You Don't Have to Cry" (with Adina Howard) – Do You Wanna Ride? (1995)
 "So Right For Life" – Set It Off OST/Missing You (with Brandy, Gladys Knight, Chaka Khan & Tamia) (CD Single B-Side) (1996)
 "Ordinary People" (with Sa Deuce) – Sa Deuce (1996)
 "Losing U" (with Nadanuf) – Worldwide (1998)
 "Praise Your Problems Away" – Spirit Rising, Vol. 2: Inspirational (2003)

References

External links
 Official Website

1977 births
Living people
American male singer-songwriters
American gospel singers
American soul singers
21st-century American singers
20th-century American singers
People from Benton Harbor, Michigan
Singer-songwriters from Michigan
20th-century American male singers
21st-century American male singers
East West Records artists
Epic Records artists